The '90s Suck and So Do You is an album by punk band Angry Samoans, released in 1999. It was their first studio album since 1988's STP Not LSD, but featured only two original members - vocalist Mike Saunders and drummer Bill Vockeroth.

Track listing
All songs by Mike Saunders unless noted.
 " I'd Rather Do the Dog" - 1:27
 "Letter from Uncle Sam" - 1:06
 "Suzy's a Loser" - 2:19
 "In and Out of Luv" - 1:08
 "Mister M.D." - 1:39
 "My Baby's Gone Gone Gone" - 1:45
 "Beat Your Heart Out" - 1:37 (Robert Lopez)
 "Don't Change My Head" - 2:15

Personnel
"Metal Mike" Saunders - vocals, guitar
Alison "Wonderslam" Victor - guitar, bass, vocals
Tony Palmer - bass guitar
Julia Altstatt - bass
Bill Vockeroth - drums

References

1999 albums
Angry Samoans albums
Bad Trip Records albums
Triple X Records albums